Catathyridium grandirivi is a species of sole in the family Achiridae. It was described by Paul Chabanaud at 1928, originally under the genus Baeostoma. It is known from Brazil.

References

Pleuronectiformes
Fish described in 1928